Ronald Duane Nery (December 30, 1934April 2, 2002) was a professional American football defensive end in the American Football League (AFL). He played four seasons for the Los Angeles/San Diego Chargers (1960–1962), the Denver Broncos (1963), and the Houston Oilers (1963).

1934 births
2002 deaths
People from New Kensington, Pennsylvania
Players of American football from Pennsylvania
American football defensive ends
Los Angeles Chargers players
San Diego Chargers players
Denver Broncos (AFL) players
Houston Oilers players
Kansas State Wildcats football players
American Football League players